Xeber Alkain Mitxelena (born 26 June 1997) is a Spanish professional footballer who plays as a right winger for Deportivo Alavés.

Club career
Born in Hondarribia, Gipuzkoa, Basque Country, Alkain joined Real Sociedad in 2016 from Antiguoko, and was initially assigned to the C-team. On 10 January 2019, after establishing himself as a starter for the C's, he was loaned to Segunda División B side Arenas Club de Getxo for the remainder of the season.

Upon returning, Alkain was assigned to the reserves also in the third division, and renewed his contract until 2021 on 1 July 2020. He was a regular starter during the 2020–21 campaign, scoring five goals as his side returned to Segunda División after 59 years; on 5 July 2021, he extended his link for a further year.

Alkain made his professional debut on 14 August 2021, coming on as a late substitute for Álex Sola in a 1–0 home win over CD Leganés. He scored his first professional goal on 11 September, netting his side's second in a 2–3 home loss against SD Eibar.

Alkain and his teammate Jérémy Blasco left Sanse on 30 May 2022, with their contract expiring in the following month. On 7 June, he signed a three-year deal with Deportivo Alavés, freshly relegated to the second level.

References

External links

1997 births
Living people
People from Hondarribia
Sportspeople from Gipuzkoa
Spanish footballers
Footballers from the Basque Country (autonomous community)
Association football wingers
Segunda División players
Segunda División B players
Tercera División players
Antiguoko players
Real Sociedad C footballers
Arenas Club de Getxo footballers
Real Sociedad B footballers
Deportivo Alavés players